Scone Road is a major road in New South Wales, Australia.The road traverses the Barrington Tops Plateau, with an elevation gain of over 1,000 metres.

References 

Roads in the Hunter Region